

The Ruhr is a river in western Germany (North Rhine-Westphalia), a right tributary (east-side) of the Rhine.

Description and history

It flows into the lower Rhine at an elevation of only  in the municipal area of Duisburg. Thus, its discharge is, for example, comparable to that of the river Ems in Northern Germany or the River Thames in the United Kingdom.

The Ruhr first passes the towns of Meschede, Arnsberg, Wickede, Fröndenberg, Holzwickede, Iserlohn, and Schwerte. Then the river marks the southern limit of the Ruhr area, passing Hagen, Dortmund, Herdecke, Wetter, Witten, Bochum, Hattingen, Essen, Mülheim, and Duisburg.

The Ruhr area was Germany's primary industrial area during the early- to mid-20th century. Most factories were located there. The occupation of the Ruhr from 1923-24 by French forces, due to the Weimar Republic's failure to continue paying reparations from World War I, provoked passive resistance, which saw production in the factories grind to a halt. As a result, the German hyperinflation crisis grew even worse.

During World War II, two of the dams on the Ruhr, the Möhne Dam and the Sorpe Dam were targets for Operation Chastise, in which special "bouncing bombs" were developed to take out the dams and flood the valley, with the hope of seriously affecting the German industries there. The story was told in a 1951 book and the popular 1955 film made from it, The Dam Busters.

Lakes

There are five Ruhr reservoirs on the river, often used for leisure activities.

 Hengsteysee between Dortmund and Hagen, surface area: 1.36 km² height of the weir 4.5m
 Harkortsee between Herdecke and Wetter; surface area: 1.37 km², height of the weir 7.8m
 Kemnader See between Witten and Bochum; surface area: 1.25 km², height of the weir 2m
 Baldeneysee in Essen-Werden; surface area: 2.64 km², height of the weir 8.5m
 Kettwiger See in Essen-Kettwig; surface area: 0.55 km², height of the weir 6m

Tributaries
The main tributaries of the Ruhr are (from source to mouth):
Left: Berkelbach, Voßmecke, Neger, Elpe, Valme, Nierbach, Henne, Kelbke, Wenne, Mühlenbach, Röhr, Bachumer Bach, Haßbach, Scheebach, Wimberbach, Hönne, Abbabach, Baarbach, Elsebach, Wannebach (Ergste), Lenne, Volme, Sprockhöveler Bach, Deilbach, Oefter Bach, Rinderbach

Right: Hillebach, Gierskoppbach, Gebke (Meschede), Kleine Gebke, Gebke (Wennemen), Wanne, Möhne, Wannebach (Westhofen), Borbach, Wannenbach, Hörsterholzer Bach, Knöselsbach, Rumbach

See also
Ruhr (area)
Occupation of the Ruhr (1923–1924)
Nearby rivers: Rhine, Lippe, Emscher
Ruhrpolen: the Poles of the Ruhr

References
Notes

Sources

External links

Rivers of North Rhine-Westphalia
 
Rivers of Germany